The Oboe Concerto in C major, Hoboken number (VIIg:C1), commonly attributed to Joseph Haydn, was most likely composed around 1790. However, modern musicologists agree that Haydn did not write the concerto.

Structure 
The work is composed of three movements:

 Allegro spirituoso
 Andante
 Rondo: Allegretto

Full performances last about 22 minutes.

Charles-David Lehrer believed that the first movement of the concerto was similar to the oboe concertos of Johann Christian Fischer, Johann Christian Bach, and Carl Stamitz, also arguing that it was similar in structure to the Johann Stamitz and Carl Philipp Emanuel Bach, even though the Haydn concerto had a contrasting B theme.

Authorship 
Though commonly attributed to Haydn, the authorship of the concerto has come into dispute. In the 1950s, Anthony van Hoboken included the concerto in his catalogue of Haydn's work. However, when Haydn's worklist was discovered in 2008, the concerto was not included.

The MGG and the Haynes Catalog of oboe music list the concerto as being the work of Ignaz Malzat.

References

External links
 

Concertos by Joseph Haydn
Haydn
Compositions in C major
Haydn: spurious and doubtful works
1790 compositions